The motte-and-bailey fallacy (named after the motte-and-bailey castle) is a form of argument and an informal fallacy where an arguer conflates two positions that share similarities, one modest and easy to defend (the "motte") and one much more controversial and harder to defend (the "bailey"). The arguer advances the controversial position, but when challenged, they insist that they are only advancing the more modest position. Upon retreating to the motte, the arguer can claim that the bailey has not been refuted (because the critic refused to attack the motte) or that the critic is unreasonable (by equating an attack on the bailey with an attack on the motte).

History 
Philosopher Nicholas Shackel, who coined the term, prefers to speak of a motte-and-bailey doctrine instead of a fallacy. In 2005, Shackel described the reference to medieval castle defense like this:

Shackel's original impetus was to criticize what he considered duplicitous processes of argumentation in works of academics such as Michel Foucault, David Bloor, Jean-Francois Lyotard, Richard Rorty, and Berger and Luckmann, and in postmodernist discourses in general.

The motte-and-bailey concept was popularized on the blog Slate Star Codex in 2014.

Examples 
An example given by Shackel is the statement "morality is socially constructed". In this example, the motte is that our beliefs about right and wrong are socially constructed, while the bailey is that there is no such thing as right and wrong.

According to Shackel, David Bloor's strong programme for the sociology of scientific knowledge made use of a motte-and-bailey doctrine when trying to defend his conception of knowledge as "whatever people take to be knowledge", without distinguishing between beliefs that are widely accepted but contrary to reality, and beliefs that correspond to reality. In this instance, the easily defensible motte would be the idea that what we call knowledge is what is commonly accepted as such, but the prized bailey would be that scientific knowledge is no different from other widely accepted beliefs, implying truth and reality play no role in gaining scientific knowledge.

Motte-and-bailey fallacies can also be observed in informal, non-academic discussions. For instance:

Person A: "I don't understand why people believe in astrology, there's no scientific evidence to support it."

Person B: "The moon has enough pull to cause tides every day on Earth, but it has no effect on people? Are you trying to say humans are literal gods unaffected by nature? I guess evolution isn't real, either!"

Here, Person B has substituted an easy-to-defend motte:

 "Human beings are affected by natural forces, including the Moon's gravity." 

for a controversial bailey claim:

 "Astrology's use of the positions of celestial bodies in the sky to make predictions about people's personality, characteristics, and behavior is scientifically valid."

Related concepts
The fallacy has been described as an instance of equivocation, more specifically concept-swapping, which is the substitution of one concept for another without the audience realizing.

In Shackel's original article, he argued that Michel Foucault employed "arbitrary redefinition" of elementary but inherently equivocal terms such as "truth" and "power" in order to create the illusion of "giving a profound but subtle analysis of a taken for granted concept". Shackel labeled this type of strategic rhetorical conflation of the broad colloquial understanding of a term with a technical, artificially stipulated one as "Humpty Dumptying", in reference to an exchange in Through The Looking-Glass. In Shackel's description, a motte-and-bailey doctrine relies on overawing outsiders with pseudo-profundity, similarly to what Daniel Dennett called a deepity.

Critical analysis
Responding to Shackel's use of the motte-and-bailey concept, professor of rhetoric Randy Allen Harris objected to what he saw as the use of the concept to gratuitously violate the principle of charity by distorting other people's arguments and failing to understand the other's position beyond what is required to attack it; Harris criticized such usage of the motte-and-bailey concept for "avoiding a true fight" by portraying the other unfairly, which Harris called the "offensive corollary" of the other's retreat to the defensive motte. In other words, the person who attacks someone else for retreating to the motte could be "just as guilty" of retreating to a "siege engine" instead of engaging in a deeper dialogue with the other "out on the bailey". Harris pleaded for a rhetorical analysis that would explore disagreements more carefully and respectfully.

See also

 Argumentation scheme
 Argumentation theory
 Bait-and-switch
 Cognitive bias
 Intellectual virtue
 Media manipulation
 Pooh-pooh
 Rhetoric
 Tilting at windmills

References

External links 
 

Barriers to critical thinking
Relevance fallacies